The National Sports Stadium is a multi-purpose stadium, in Harare, Zimbabwe, with a maximum capacity of 80,000 people. It is the largest stadium in Zimbabwe. Located in Harare just a Few meters from Heroes Acre. It is used mostly for football matches, but is also used for rugby union. Association football club CAPS United F.C. use the venue, which opened in 1987, for most of their home games.

Overview
The stadium played host to Amnesty International's Human Rights Now! Benefit Concert on October 7, 1988. The show was headlined by Bruce Springsteen & The E Street Band and also featured Sting and Peter Gabriel, Tracy Chapman, Youssou N'Dour and Oliver "Tuku" Mtukudzi.

The 6th All-Africa Games were held at the National Sports Stadium in 1995.

The first leg of 1998 CAF Champions League Final was held at the National Sports Stadium on 28 November 1998 between Dynamos Harare of Zimbabwe and ASEC Mimosas of Côte d'Ivoire that ended with goalless draw.

The stadium was closed for 20 months, starting November 2006, for major renovations.

On 14 September 2019, the stadium hosted Former Zimbabwean President Robert Mugabe's funeral, which was also open to public attendance, with an aerial photo showing the 60,000 capacity stadium to be about a quarter full. The funeral was attended by leaders of various African countries, including Zimbabwean President Emmerson Mnangagwa, Dr. Kenneth Kaunda of Zambia, Olusegun Obasanjo of Nigeria, Hifikepunye Pohamba and Hage Geingob both of Namibia, Joseph Kabila of DR Congo, Uhuru Kenyatta of Kenya and Cyril Ramaphosa of South Africa.

Major events
The stadium has hosted many important events since its construction such as the 1995 All-Africa Games.

References

External links
Photos at cafe.daum.net/stade
Photo at worldstadiums.com
Photos at fussballtempel.net

Football venues in Zimbabwe
Athletics (track and field) venues in Zimbabwe
Zimbabwe
Stadiums of the African Games
Sport in Harare
Buildings and structures in Harare
Stadiums in Zimbabwe
Multi-purpose stadiums in Zimbabwe
CAPS United F.C.
1987 establishments in Zimbabwe
Sports venues completed in 1987